Hyde House may refer to:

in the United Kingdom (by county)
Hyde House (Buckinghamshire), an early 18th-century Grade II listed house in Hyde Heath, Buckinghamshire
Hyde House (Dorset), a Grade II listed house on Purbeck, in Dorset
Hyde House (Essex), a  Grade II listed house in Layer-de-la-Haye, Colchester, Essex
Hyde House (Gloucestershire), a Grade II listed house in Minchinhampton, Stroud, Gloucestershire	
Hyde House (Hampshire), a Grade II* listed house in Winchester, Hampshire
Hyde House (Herefordshire), a Grade II listed house in Woolhope, Herefordshire	
Hyde House (Lambeth), a mid 19th-century Grade II listed house in Lambeth

in the United States (by state then city)
Hyde Mountain Lookout House, Camp Wood, Arizona, listed on the National Register of Historic Places (NRHP) in Yavapai County, Arizona
Mathis-Hyde House, Augusta, Arkansas, listed on the NRHP in Woodruff County, Arkansas
Hyde House (Visalia, California), listed on the NRHP in Tulare County, California
Hyde-St. John House, Hartford, Connecticut, listed on the NRHP in Hartford, Connecticut
William A. Hyde House, Pocatello, Idaho, listed on the NRHP in Bannock County, Idaho
Hyde Mansion, Bath, Maine, listed on the NRHP in Sagadahoc County, Maine
Chase-Hyde Farm, Fall River, Massachusetts, NRHP-listed
Hyde House (Lee, Massachusetts), NRHP-listed, in Berkshire County, Massachusetts
Hyde House (Newton, Massachusetts), NRHP-listed, in Middlesex County, Massachusetts
Eleazer Hyde House, Newton, Massachusetts, NRHP-listed
Gershom Hyde House, Newton, Massachusetts
Hyde House (Glens Falls, New York), NRHP-listed, in Warren County, New York
Hyde Hall, Springfield Center, New York, NRHP-listed
Horner-Hyde House, Pierre, South Dakota, listed on the NRHP in Hughes County, South Dakota
Hyde Buildings, Pierre, South Dakota, listed on the NRHP in Hughes County, South Dakota
Hartwell B. Hyde House, Triune, Tennessee, listed on the NRHP in Williamson County, Tennessee
Hyde Log Cabin, Grand Isle, Vermont, NRHP-listed in Grand Isle County, Vermont
Samuel Hyde House, Seattle, Washington, NRHP-listed in King County, Washington